Heterogamy is a term applied to a variety of distinct phenomena in different scientific domains. Usually having to do with some kind of difference, "hetero", in reproduction, "gamy". See below for more specific senses.

Science

Reproductive biology
In reproductive biology, heterogamy is the alternation of differently organized generations, applied to the alternation between parthenogenetic and a sexual generation. This type of heterogamy occurs for example in some aphids.

Alternately, heterogamy or heterogamous is often used as a synonym of heterogametic, meaning the presence of two unlike chromosomes in a sex. For example, XY males and ZW females are called the heterogamous sex.

Cell biology

In cell biology, heterogamy is a synonym of anisogamy, the condition of having differently sized male and female gametes produced by different sexes or mating types in a species.

Botany

In botany, a plant is heterogamous when it carries at least two different types of flowers in regard to their reproductive structures, for example male and female flowers or bisexual and female flowers. Stamens and carpels are not regularly present in each flower or floret.

Social science

In sociology, heterogamy refers to a marriage between two individuals that differ in a certain criterion, and is contrasted with homogamy for a marriage or union between partners that match according to that criterion. For example, ethnic heterogamy refers to marriages involving individuals of different ethnic groups. Age heterogamy refers to marriages involving partners of significantly different ages. Heterogamy and homogamy are also used to describe marriage or union between people of unlike and like sex (or gender) respectively.

See also

 Heterogametic
 Homogametic

References

Plant reproduction
Genetics
Exogamy